Governor Nelson State Park is a  Wisconsin state park located outside of Waunakee, Wisconsin  in the town of Westport on the north shore of Lake Mendota.  It is named for former Wisconsin Governor Gaylord Nelson. On most days the Wisconsin State Capitol building can be seen in nearby Madison.  Common activities include boating, fishing, picnicking and swimming.  There is also a boat launch and a swimming area for pets.  Away from the lake one can find restored prairie and savanna, effigy mounds, hiking trails and ski trails.  Governor Nelson State Park is one of the few Wisconsin state parks that does not allow overnight camping.

History

A portion of the site of the park originally hosted a boys' camp called Camp Indianola.  Orson Welles was a camper at the camp in his youth. The camp closed in 1967.

References

External links
 Governor Nelson State Park official website

Protected areas of Dane County, Wisconsin
State parks of Wisconsin
Protected areas established in 1975
1975 establishments in Wisconsin